Tom Weatherston (born February 15, 1950) is an American industrial engineer and Republican politician.  He served in the Wisconsin State Assembly from 2013 through 2019, representing the northern half of Racine County.

Early life

Born in Buffalo, New York, Weatherston served in the United States Air Force as a civil engineer and was stationed in Vietnam during the Vietnam War. He went to Erie Community College, where he received an associate degree. He then graduated from Buffalo State College, where he received his bachelor's degree in industrial engineering. In 1977, Weatherston was hired by the Modine Manufacturing Company and moved to Racine, Wisconsin.

Political career
In 2010, Weatherston was elected to the Caledonia, Wisconsin, Village Board of Trustees and served until 2013.

In November 2012, Weatherston was elected to the Wisconsin State Assembly in the newly redrawn 62nd Assembly District. He won re-election in 2014 and 2016 without opposition.

In 2017, Weatherston spearheaded the law proposal American Laws for American Courts banning Sharia in Wisconsin. It was criticised by the president of NAML, Asifa Quraishi-Landes, through statement "They see any acknowledgment of Sharia in American Muslim life as a first step to the Trojan Horse."

In April 2018, Weatherston announced that he would not seek re-election to a 4th term.

He instead ran to rejoin the Caledonia Village Board of Trustees in 2019.  He defeated incumbent trustee Jay Benkowski in the April 2, 2019, spring general election.

Weatherston is a member of Vietnam Veterans of America Chapter 767 and Veterans of Foreign Wars Post 10301.

Electoral history

| colspan="6" style="text-align:center;background-color: #e9e9e9;"| Primary Election

| colspan="6" style="text-align:center;background-color: #e9e9e9;"| General Election

| colspan="6" style="text-align:center;background-color: #e9e9e9;"| Primary Election

| colspan="6" style="text-align:center;background-color: #e9e9e9;"| General Election

| colspan="6" style="text-align:center;background-color: #e9e9e9;"| Primary Election

| colspan="6" style="text-align:center;background-color: #e9e9e9;"| General Election

| colspan="6" style="text-align:center;background-color: #e9e9e9;"| General Election, April 2, 2019

Notes

Living people
Politicians from Buffalo, New York
Politicians from Racine, Wisconsin
University at Buffalo alumni
Military personnel from Buffalo, New York
Wisconsin city council members
Republican Party members of the Wisconsin State Assembly
1950 births
21st-century American politicians
People from Caledonia, Wisconsin